Al Warqa, sometimes spelled Al Warqa`a or Al Warqaa is a locality in Dubai, United Arab Emirates (UAE). Located southeast of Dubai Creek, Al Warqaa is bordered to the north by Mirdif, the west by Nad Al Hammar- Awir and the south by Warsan or International City.

The routes E 311 (Emirates Road) and E 44 (Al Awir Road) form the western and southern peripheries of Al Warqaa. Once a sparsely populated industrial locality close to Dubai city limits, Al Warqaa is now experiencing considerable growth due to the development of International City and other real estate projects near the area. Al Warqaa is divided into subcommunities, from Al Warqaa 1 — Al Warqa´a 5.

Some landmarks in Al Warqaa include Dubai Municipality garbage disposal centre  Aswaaq mall and Al Warqa Grand Mosque.

Schools 

 Sharjah American International School (Dubai campus)
 Our Own English High School for Girls  (Al Warqaa)
 Our Own High School for Boys (Al Warqa) 
 Primus School (Al Warqaa 1)
 International School of Arts and Science (Al Warqaa 1)
 Ignite School
 International Academic School (Al Warqaa 1)

Parks
Al Warqa has 3 parks in its vicinity. Mushrif Park borders Warqa although located in Mushrif. Another park recently opened was constructed at a cost of Dh22 million, on 27.1-hectares at Al Warqa 3, with recreational, sports and service facilities such as a 3.5 km running track, a 3.55 km cycle track, a 3.5 km sandy track, two football fields planted with natural grass, and basketball and tennis courts.
Al Warqa 2 has its own park. The total area of the park is 1.7 hectares and there are areas for children's plays, sandy areas for ball games for adults, a synthetic jogging track and other buildings services.

A larger safari park, Dubai Safari Park, constructed in Al Warqa 5 on Aweer Road in an area of 400 hectares, includes a safari park, butterfly park, golf courses, entertainment and recreational areas. Dubai Safari replaces the ailing Dubai Zoo. 2,500 animals of around 250 species were relocated to the new site.

References 

Communities in Dubai